Hassan Ibrahim (1917 – 1990) was an Egyptian Air Force officer and one of the founders of the Free Officers movement.

Early life and education
Ibrahim was born in Alexandria in 1917. He graduated from the Egyptian Air Academy in 1927.

Free Officers Movement
Ibrahim was among five military officers who formed the first cell of the Free Officers movement in July or September 1949. Although it is argued that Ibrahim along with other officers was a member of the Muslim Brotherhood's special unit from 1944 to 1945, there is another report stating that Ibrahim was part of the group called Young Egypt. In addition, Ibrahim was one of the nine-member leadership group of the Free Officers movement. The movement led the 1952 Revolution. Then Ibrahim became a member of the 14-member Revolution Command Council that was charged with the running of Egypt following the success of the revolution.

Career
Ibrahim participated in the Palestinian war in 1948. In 1952 he served as an Air Force group captain. In 1954 he led the group who expelled President Mohamed Naguib from Abdeen Palace. He was one of the three judges, who tried the members of the Muslim Brotherhood after their attempted assassination attack against President Gamal Abdel Nasser in 1954. The other judges were Anwar Sadat and Abdel Latif Boghdadi. Ibrahim was also appointed minister for presidential affairs in 1954. Two years later, in 1956, he was named the head of the Egyptian economy agency. After dealing with business for a while, in February 1964, he was appointed as one of seven vice deputies of President Nasser. Ibrahim resigned from office in 1966 due to Nasser's request to end his extramarital relationship, and continued business activities.

Later years and death
Ibrahim published a book in 1975, The Silent Ones Speak. In the book he criticized Gamal Abdel Nasser. He died in 1990.

Honour

Foreign honour
 Malaysia:
 Honorary Grand Commander of the Order of the Defender of the Realm (SMN (K)) - Tun (1965)

References

External links

20th-century Egyptian businesspeople
1917 births
1990 deaths
Egyptian Air Academy alumni
Egyptian Air Force air marshals
Egyptian military leaders
Free Officers Movement (Egypt)
Government ministers of Egypt
Honorary Grand Commanders of the Order of the Defender of the Realm
Vice-presidents of Egypt
Politicians from Alexandria
Egyptian people of the 1948 Arab–Israeli War